Lichenomima is a genus of mouse-like barklice in the family Myopsocidae. There are more than 40 described species in Lichenomima.

Species
These 49 species belong to the genus Lichenomima:

 Lichenomima ampla (Smithers & Thornton, 1974)
 Lichenomima argentina Williner, 1944
 Lichenomima ariasi (New, 1980)
 Lichenomima burgeoni (Navas, 1936)
 Lichenomima cameruna (Enderlein, 1903)
 Lichenomima capeneri (Smithers, 1973)
 Lichenomima cervantesi Garcia Aldrete, 1994
 Lichenomima chelata (Thornton & Woo, 1973)
 Lichenomima clypeofasciata (Mockford, 1974)
 Lichenomima coloradensis (Banks, 1907)
 Lichenomima conspersa Enderlein, 1910
 Lichenomima corniculata Li, 1995
 Lichenomima cubitalis Lienhard, 2004
 Lichenomima cylindra Li, 2002
 Lichenomima elongata (Thornton, 1960)
 Lichenomima excavata Li, 2002
 Lichenomima fasciata Badonnel, 1946
 Lichenomima fenestrata Enderlein, 1926
 Lichenomima gibbulosa Li, 2002
 Lichenomima guineensis Enderlein, 1914
 Lichenomima hamata Li, 1995
 Lichenomima hangzhouensis Li, 2002
 Lichenomima harpeodes Li, 2002
 Lichenomima indica Datta, 1969
 Lichenomima intermedia Pearman, 1934
 Lichenomima leucospila Li, 2002
 Lichenomima lugens (Hagen, 1861)
 Lichenomima machadoi (Badonnel, 1977)
 Lichenomima maxima Smithers, 1957
 Lichenomima medialis (Thornton, 1981)
 Lichenomima merapi Thornton & Browning, 1992
 Lichenomima muscosa (Enderlein, 1906)
 Lichenomima onca Mockford, 1991
 Lichenomima orbiculata Li, 2002
 Lichenomima oxycera Li, 2002
 Lichenomima pauliani Badonnel, 1949
 Lichenomima posterior (Navas, 1927)
 Lichenomima pulchella (New & Thornton, 1975)
 Lichenomima punctipennis Mockford, 1996
 Lichenomima sanguensis (New, 1973)
 Lichenomima schoutedeni Badonnel, 1946
 Lichenomima sinuosa Lienhard, 2004
 Lichenomima sparsa (Hagen, 1861)
 Lichenomima sumatrana (Enderlein, 1906)
 Lichenomima thorntoni Mockford, 1991
 Lichenomima timmei Mockford, 1991
 Lichenomima tridens Li, 2002
 Lichenomima unicornis Li, 2002
 Lichenomima varia (Navas, 1927)

References

External links

 

Psocetae
Articles created by Qbugbot